Ixia monadelpha  is an Ixia species found in wet sandy flats in the southwestern Cape of South Africa.

Gallery

References

External links

monadelpha
Endemic flora of South Africa
Plants described in 1766